Marc Stephen John Bircham (born 11 May 1978 in Wembley) is a former footballer. Born in England, he represented Canada at international level.

Club career
London-born Bircham started his professional career at Millwall and after 6 seasons joined Queens Park Rangers where he became a crowd favorite. Bircham used to be known for his unusual hairstyle – a dyed blue and white streak down the centre of his hair from when he played for QPR and a red and white streak while playing for Canada. QPR fans sang a song to the tune of "I Love You, Baby": "We love you, Bircham/ because you got blue hair/ We love you, Bircham/ because you're everywhere/ We love you, Bircham/ because you're Rangers through and through."

In 2007, he moved to Yeovil Town. He scored his first and what turned out to be only goal for Yeovil against Brentford in the Football League Trophy. After a series of ankle injuries in the 2008–09 season it was revealed that Bircham had quit football and is going to set up a youth coaching camp in Cyprus.

International career
Bircham was eligible to play for Canada because one of his grandfathers was born in Winnipeg. He made his debut for Canada in an April 1999 friendly match against Northern Ireland in Belfast. He is the only player to have played for a country without actually visiting it when his first cap – as well as his first and only goal – came. He scored that goal only 8 minutes after coming on as a substitute for another player making his debut, Davide Xausa.

Bircham earned 17 caps for his adopted country, representing Canada in two FIFA World Cup qualification matches. His final international was a June 2004 World Cup qualification match against Belize.

Managerial career

QPR
After becoming a QPR youth coach at the start of the 2009–10 season, he was put in temporary charge with fellow Youth Coach Steve Gallen due to manager Jim Magilton's suspension on 9 December 2009. The duo took charge of a 2–2 draw away to West Bromwich Albion on 14 December 2009.

Waterford
On 12 May 2021, Bircham was named manager of League of Ireland Premier Division side Waterford until the end of the season. With Waterford bottom of the table when Bircham took over, he led his side to 6 wins and a draw from his first 12 league games in charge, taking the club out of the relegation zone and earning a new 2 and a half year contract which was announced in August 2021. On 23 November 2021, Bircham was sacked by Waterford, having learned of the news on Twitter without being contacted by the club following a text exchange between himself and owner Richard Forrest the previous night in which Forrest suspended Bircham for a week, preventing him from taking charge of the club's crucial Promotion/relegation play-off Final against UCD.

In the summer of 2022, he was appointed as first team coach of Italian Serie B side Como under manager Giacomo Gattuso.

Personal life
Bircham has 3 children from a previous marriage. 1 boy, Frankie and 2 girls, Layla & Dolly.

He currently regularly appears on Talksport.

Career statistics

International
Scores and results list Canada's goal tally first.

Managerial
As of 23 November 2021.

References

External links
 
  (archive)
 

1978 births
Living people
Footballers from Wembley
English people of Canadian descent
English footballers
Association football midfielders
Canadian soccer players
Canadian expatriate soccer players
Canada men's international soccer players
2001 FIFA Confederations Cup players
Millwall F.C. players
Queens Park Rangers F.C. players
Yeovil Town F.C. players
English Football League players
Queens Park Rangers F.C. non-playing staff
Queens Park Rangers F.C. managers
Chicago Fire FC non-playing staff
Canadian expatriate sportspeople in England
English football managers